The Wild Man of the Navidad (or the Wild Woman of the Navidad) is believed to be one of the first sightings of Bigfoot in Texas.

History 
It was first widely reported in 1837 throughout the early settlements along the Navidad River bottoms, circa the modern-day town of Sublime, Texas, in Lavaca County. Slaves along the Navidad called it "The Thing that Comes," for, though no one saw it, there was always evidence that something had come. On moonlit nights from as early as 1836, people would find food missing from their cabins, even though an intruder would have had to step over sleeping dogs to reach it. Families stopped fattening hogs, because a fat hog would inevitably be replaced by a scrawny one. Though valuables such as watches or money were never taken, sometimes tools would disappear only to reappear later, beautifully polished. Occasionally searchers would find a camp, but "The Thing" never returned while they waited.

The creature was most often described as covered in short brown hair and very nimble, which allowed for it to elude capture for many years. The Rev. Samuel C.A. Rogers, a circuit-riding minister in the area, first saw a total of three footprints in the spring of 1845 and continued to spot them for several years before all but the largest disappeared.  Although some believe the creatures survived for many years, Rogers wrote that in 1850, the largest hunt for the wild man was organized, and the hunters did trap a man in a tree, surrounded by baying dogs, horses and men with guns.

This is where the legend diverges into varying versions - the most common being that the captured man was actually a solitary African who wore no clothes and spoke no English. In 1851, a sailor who spoke the man's African dialect reportedly came traveling through the area. It turned out that the "wild man" was a prince who'd been sold into slavery as a child. After reaching Texas, he and a companion had escaped, but the companion had died from exposure after a few years. The Texas State Gazette published a runaway slave capture notice from June 24 to August 12, 1854, for "an AFRICAN well known as the Wild Woman of the Navidad, supposed to belong to Beckford, late of Virginia" that was taken up in Lavaca County. It's said that the Wild Man of the Navidad was eventually sold into slavery in Victoria, Texas, and lived in Refugio and Victoria Counties until his death in 1884.

A collection of these early accounts were later published in their entirety in J. Frank Dobie's book "Tales of Old-Time Texas" in 1928.

Films

In 2008, the 86-minute horror feature The Wild Man of the Navidad was made. It was written and directed by Duane Graves and Justin Meeks, and co-produced by their college filmmaking instructor Kim Henkel - who just happened to be the co-writer/producer of Tobe Hooper's seminal 1974 horror classic The Texas Chain Saw Massacre. The Wild Man of the Navidad premiered at the 2008 Tribeca Film Festival in New York City and was later released by IFC Films in 2009.

Although the film does have a loose connection to the original Wild Man story, the filmmakers based the bulk of it on a supposed "new story" from the real-life journals of one Dale S. Rogers, who claims to be a direct descendant of Samuel C.A. Rogers. In his writings, Mr. Rogers described a series of bizarre encounters he and his family had with the creature(s) as late as 1975. The part of Dale S. Rogers was played by co-director Justin Meeks.

The movie is set in the real-life town of Sublime, Texas, but it was actually shot on location in Whitsett, Texas, and nearby Campbellton, Texas, on a shoestring budget. Many of the supporting characters in the film were locals of that area, and the entire production was designed to be a deliberate stylistic echo of the 1970s drive-in B-movies it pays close homage to.

See also
 List of topics characterized as pseudoscience
 Yeti

References

Further reading
 "The Robertsons, the Sutherlands, and the Making of Texas," Anne H. Sutherland, Texas A&M University Press, 2006,

External links
 Texas Bigfoot Conservancy
 The Wild Man of the Navidad Official Website
 Wild Man of the Navidad

Bigfoot
Texas folklore